Charles Graham Chambers (12 July 1870 – 30 January 1921) was an English cricketer who made one appearance in first-class cricket in 1894. He was a right-handed batsman.

Early life and education 
Chambers is the son of a Dorset reverend. He began his education at Marlborough College in January 1882, where he later played for the cricket XI and rugby XV.

He left Marlborough in the mid-summer of 1889, after which he proceeded to study at Lincoln College, Oxford.

Career 
After graduating from Oxford with a BA, Chambers lived in the Liverpool area and played his club cricket for Boughton Hall. He was selected to play what would be his only first-class cricket match in 1894 when picked for the Liverpool and District cricket team against Yorkshire at Aigburth.

In a match which Yorkshire won by 10 wickets, Chambers scored 16 runs in Liverpool and District first-innings, before being dismissed bowled by Thomas Foster. In Yorkshire's first-innings he bowled 3 wicketless overs which conceded 13 runs, and in Liverpool and District second-innings he scored 5 runs before Foster had him dismissed caught behind by David Hunter.

Chambers had moved south by 1896, where he was employed as a solicitor at Friar Street in Reading, Berkshire. It was at Reading that he died on 30 January 1921.

References

External links
Charles Chambers at ESPNcricinfo
Charles Chambers at CricketArchive

1870 births
1921 deaths
People from West Berkshire District
People educated at Marlborough College
Alumni of Lincoln College, Oxford
English cricketers
Liverpool and District cricketers
English solicitors